Yogesh Joshi may refer to:

 Yogesh Joshi (poet) (born 1955), Gujarati language poet and author
 Yogesh M. Joshi (born 1974), Indian chemical engineer
 Yogesh Kumar Joshi (born 1962), Indian Army general
 Yogesh Vinayan Joshi, Indian screenwriter, co-writer of the 2008 film Mumbai Meri Jaan